The ancient university governance structure in Scotland is the organisational system imposed by a series of Acts of Parliament called the Universities (Scotland) Acts 1858 to 1966. The Acts applied to what were termed the 'older universities': the University of St Andrews, the University of Glasgow, the University of Aberdeen and the University of Edinburgh. Together these four universities are commonly referred to as the ancient universities of Scotland. Whilst the Acts do not directly apply to the University of Dundee (except insofar as section 13 of the Act of 1966 conferred a power to appoint, by Order in Council, the date for its independence from the University of St Andrews), the same governance structure was ordained for use by that institution in its Royal charter.

The tripartite constitution
The ancient structure applies a tripartite relationship of bodies with authority over the university. These are the university court, the general council and the senatus academicus (rendered in English as the academic senate).

Senatus academicus
The senatus academicus is the supreme academic body of a university, presided over by the Principal.

The body will typically consist of the principal, any vice-principals, all professors, deans of faculties, heads of schools and colleges, elected representatives of non-professorial academic staff, elected student representatives, the university's chief librarian and any other significant persons specified in university ordinances.

In practice, the chief power of the senatus academicus is to elect a number of assessors to serve on the university court. The powers granted to the body are theoretically contained s.5 of the 1858 Act to "regulate the teaching and discipline of the University, and administer its property and revenues, subject to the control and review of the University court, as herein-after provided".

Often the full senatus rarely meets and under Section 5 has a quorum of one-third of its membership. The senatus often devolves some of its authority to a smaller academic council.

University court

The university courts were first established for the ancient universities by the 1858 Act and are responsible for the finances and administration of each university. Each university, subject to approval by the Privy Council, determines the constitution of its court, with members coming from within each university, the local community and beyond.

Changes to the statutes that govern the ancient universities are considered by the Scottish Universities Committee of the Privy Council; the Committee members include, provided that they are Privy Counsellors, the First Minister of Scotland, the Lord Justice General, the Lord Justice Clerk,  the Lord Advocate, the Chancellors and Rectors of Aberdeen, Edinburgh, Glasgow, and St Andrews, and one member of the Judicial Committee. The quorum is three, and in practice the Committee's work is undertaken by the First Minister, Lord Justice General and Lord Advocate through correspondence.

In the ancient universities, but not in Dundee, the court is chaired by the rector. Members are also appointed by the general council, senatus academicus and some ex officio members drawn from the local authority. There will be a number of lay-members on the court, as well as representatives drawn from the students' representative council.

General council

The general council is a corporate body of all senior academics and graduates presided over by the chancellor of the university, an official which it elects for life. Members who are not also members of the senatus academicus are entitled to elect assessors to the university court.

Chiefly the general council is an advisory body, and exists to connect alumni with their alma mater. The general councils were also connected with the Scottish university constituencies of the Parliament of the United Kingdom until their abolition in 1950.

Officers
The officers of the ancient universities often predate the Universities (Scotland) Acts which give them statutory authority by centuries.

The Chancellor
The Chancellor is nominal head of the university. They are elected for life by the General Council by virtue of Section 2 of the Universities (Scotland) Act 1858. The Chancellor is given the statutory duty of awarding degrees, but may delegate this to a Vice-Chancellor and it has become convention for the Chancellor to appoint the Principal as Vice-Chancellor. The position of Vice-Chancellor does not confer any other powers or responsibility on the Principal.

The involvement of university chancellors varies from institution to institution, in some always participating in academic ceremonies and in others almost never taking this position. The Chancellor is often a member of the Royal Family, a local dignitary, or noble or significant academic with some tie to the university or local area. As a consequence, the Chancellor's chief role is often to promote the university rather than involve themselves in the organisation of it. The Royal Commission on the Universities and Colleges of Scotland in 1826 defined the role thus:

The Chancellor serves as President of the General Council once elected. They also appoint an Assessor to serve on the University Court. Prior to the episcopacy losing its authority in Scotland, the Chancellor was commonly the local bishop of the diocese within which the university was situated.

Current Chancellors

Principal and Vice Chancellor
The Principal is the chief executive of the university, president of the Senatus Academicus, and is appointed by the University Court. The other senior officials of the university (usually with a specific portfolio of subject or over faculties or colleges) are often titled Vice Principals.

Given that the Principal is by custom appointed as Vice-Chancellor the full style of the Principal is 'Principal and Vice Chancellor'; as Vice-Chancellor the Principal can award degrees in the absence of the Chancellor.

Current Principals

The Rector
The office of Rector is one of the oldest institutions of university government, dating back to the original papal bulls which formed the earliest of the ancient universities in Scotland. Originally, the Rector was effective head of the university, chosen as an academic from with it, but whose power was diluted by that of the Chancellor – the latter being the official representative of the Church.

Following the Protestant reformation, the previous position became inevitably untenable. As such, the position of Rector evolved and has varied greatly in terms of power wielded throughout history. In recent times, the Lord Rector was given a statutory position by virtue of the 1889 Act to chair the University Court, although the Dundee rectorship is a notable exception, with the court instead appointing a lay member and the holder of the rectorship not being formally titled 'Lord Rector'. Gradually the responsibility of the Rector to his electorate ensured that he also functioned as a representative of students within the university, and an external promoter of the university. Rectors in the past century have often been well-known celebrities, politicians or political activists and may not have any personal link to the university beforehand.

Today, Rectors in these universities are elected for three year terms, enabling all students taking a typical four year undergraduate degree to vote at least once. The entire body of students is now typically considered together, in contrast to the old position whereby the Rector was elected by student 'nations' (usually four, divided by the county in which the students originated) within the university – a practice only discontinued in the Glasgow rectorship in 1977. The Edinburgh Rector is, uniquely, elected by both staff and students.

Typically, a Scottish university rector will work closely with the Students' Association and is usually commended to the Chancellor or Vice Chancellor by the President of the Association in order to be ceremonially installed. A rectorial installation is a major academic event often involving a number of traditions, most centrally a Rectorial Address - a speech made to the students and public.

Current Rectors
The five current Rectors are:

Together the five rectors participate in the Scottish Rectors Group, to represent their common interests.

Other Attributes

Students' representative councils
A students' representative council is a body usually, although not in the case of Glasgow, constituted within a Students' Association for the representation of student interests, particularly related to the academic administration of the university. There is a statutory obligation for the ancient governed universities to have an SRC.

Red undergraduate gowns
Undergraduate students of all the ancient governed universities in Scotland are entitled to wear the red undergraduate gown. Undergraduate members of Saint Mary's College, in the University of Saint Andrews wear a black gown with open sleeves and charged with a violet saltire cross on the left facing.

The Universities (Scotland) Acts
The following are the Acts of the Parliament of the United Kingdom known as the Universities (Scotland) Acts. These Acts of Parliament formed the basis of the modern system of governance in the ancient universities of Scotland - with the same principles being incorporated into the University of Dundee's Royal charter. The Acts may be cited together as the Universities (Scotland) Acts 1858 to 1966. Regulation of higher education is, since 1999, a devolved matter, within the legislative competence of the Scottish Parliament.

Other consequences
Aside from providing a constitution for university governance, the Universities (Scotland) Acts also had a number of other consequences for higher education in Scotland. The 1858 Act laid the foundations for a merger between King's College, Aberdeen and Marischal College, also in Aberdeen, to form the University of Aberdeen in 1860. The 1966 Act pre-empted the creation of the University of Dundee from Queen's College of the University of St Andrews. The 1889 Act created a Scottish Universities Committee within the Privy Council and made provisions to allow for the expansion of the Scottish universities. The 1932 Act repealed the requirement for Principals and Professors to declare themselves as being of the Protestant faith, formerly a requirement of the Protestant Religion and Presbyterian Church Act 1707.

Anomalies
There are a number of anomalies to the general structures outlined above, although where notable they have attempted to be incorporated into the article itself:

University of Aberdeen
 The University of Aberdeen's students' representative council uses the name 'Students' Association Council', despite its legal name being unchanged, to emphasise its links with the Aberdeen University Students' Association.

University of Dundee
 The University of Dundee's status is not governed by the Universities (Scotland) Acts, but instead laid down in the university's own Royal Charter. This is the result of Dundee, previously an incorporated college of the University of St Andrews, having attained its independent university status in 1967. While this makes little difference in practice, it separates Dundee from the ancient universities in legal terms.
 The Rector of the University of Dundee was only granted the style 'Rector' in the Royal Charter and hence is not properly entitled to the formal style of 'Lord Rector'. He or she also lacks the right to chair meetings of the University Court, with the body electing a lay member instead to carry out this function.

University of Edinburgh
 The Rector of the University of Edinburgh is elected by both staff and matriculated students, as opposed to the other four Rectors who are elected by their university's students alone.

University of Glasgow
 The Glasgow University students' representative council, unlike in other universities, is not effectively incorporated into a Students' Association as Glasgow maintains two student unions (the Glasgow University Union and the Queen Margaret Union).

References

External links
 

Ancient universities of Scotland
Higher education in Scotland
University governance